{{DISPLAYTITLE:C15H18O8}}
The molecular formula C15H18O8 (molar mass: 326.29 g/mol, exact mass: 326.100168 u) may refer to:
 Bilobalide, a terpenic trilactone present in Ginkgo biloba
 p-Coumaric acid glucoside a hydroxycinnamic acid found in commercial breads containing flaxseed

Molecular formulas